The B11 is a national road in Namibia, running since 2013 from the B10 near Nkurenkuru to Katwitwi. The road, together with the B10 and B15 from Tsumeb, cost 910 million NAD. Construction has been carried out in three phases since 2009 by the Namibian Roads Contractor Company (RCC) and the China Henan International Cooperation Group.

References

Roads in Namibia